The California Master Plan for Higher Education of 1960 was developed by a survey team appointed by the Regents of the University of California and the California State Board of Education during the administration of Governor Pat Brown. UC President Clark Kerr was a key figure in its development. The Plan set up a coherent system for public postsecondary education which defined specific roles for the already-existing University of California (UC), the state colleges which were joined together by the Plan into the State College System of California and later renamed the California State University (CSU), and the junior colleges which were later organized in 1967 into the California Community Colleges (CCC) system.

The statutory framework implementing the plan was signed into law as the Donahoe Higher Education Act (honoring Assemblywoman Dorothy M. Donahoe, one of the plan's foremost advocates) by Brown on April 27, 1960.

History
Prior to the Master Plan's development in the 1960s, California struggled for many years to reform and improve its social institutions. In response to the powerful railroad monopolies' stranglehold on state business and politics at the turn of the 20th century, new Progressive reformers attempted to overthrow the economic and political corruption then prevailing in the state at the time. They hoped to create new institutions infused with public morality and purpose.  However, in the early years of California's modern development the population had remained largely mobile, moving from opportunity to opportunity, making it almost impossible for the state to create permanent public schools that could effectively educate children from start to finish. Furthermore, California progressives encountered obstacles in the form of people who thought that education should remain the work of local and religious groups, as well as being opposed to paying taxes for social purposes. Another barrier that they needed to circumvent was the issue of appropriating land and money for universities. The 1st and 2nd Organic Acts (of 1866 and 1868, respectively) helped by first introducing the possibility of a state secular higher education institution and second, actually authorizing the creation of a state university controlled by a Board of Regents (which would become the University of California).

In the 1950s, the state's legislators and academic administrators foresaw an approaching surge in university enrollment, due to the baby boom children coming of age. They needed a plan to be able to maintain educational quality in the face of growing demand. The underlying principles that they sought were:
 That some form of higher education ought to be available to all regardless of their economic means, and that academic progress should be limited only by individual proficiency; and
 differentiation of function so that each of the three systems would strive for excellence in different areas, so as to not waste public resources on duplicate efforts.

The original Master Plan was approved by the Regents and the State Board of Education and submitted to the Legislature in February 1960. In April of that year, the California Legislature passed the Donahoe Higher Education Act, which implemented several components of the Plan as statutory law. However, California's Master Plan is more than a single statute. The 1960 Master Plan is embodied in several documents:
 A study completed by the Master Plan Survey Team approved by the State Board of Education and the UC Board of Regents
 The Donahoe Higher Education Act giving legal force to several key components of the plan
 A constitutional amendment which established the Trustees of the California State Colleges (renamed the California State University in 1974).

Purpose
Kerr stated that the goal of the Master Plan was to balance the "competing demands of fostering excellence and guaranteeing educational access for all."

The Master Plan achieved the following:
 It created a system that combined exceptional quality with broad access for students.
 It transformed a collection of uncoordinated and competing colleges and universities into a coherent system.
 It established a broad framework for higher education that encourages each of the three public higher education segments to concentrate on creating its own kind of excellence within its own particular set of responsibilities.
 And it acknowledged the vital role of the independent colleges and universities, envisioning higher education in California as a single continuum of educational opportunity, from small private colleges to large public universities.

According to the Plan, the top one-eighth (12.5%) of graduating high school seniors would be guaranteed a place at a campus of the University of California tuition-free. The top one-third (33.3%) would be able to enter the California State University system. Junior colleges (later renamed "community colleges" in 1967) would accept any students "capable of benefiting from instruction."  These percentages are now enforced by sliding scales equating grade point average and scores on the SAT or ACT, which are recalculated every year. No actual ranking of students in high schools is used as many schools do not rank students.

Graduates of the junior colleges would be guaranteed the right to transfer to the UC or CSU systems in order to complete bachelor's degrees. This practice was carried over from previous years before the Plan was enacted; graduates from the junior colleges had traditionally been accepted as upper-division transfer students at the state colleges or UC campuses by virtue of their prior coursework. Finally, the Plan established that the University of California would be the sole portion of the system charged with performing research, and would award master's and doctoral degrees in support of that mission. The Cal State system, in addition to awarding master's degrees, would be able to award joint doctorates with the UC.

The "California Idea"—California's tripartite system of public research universities, comprehensive 4-year undergraduate campuses, and open-access community colleges—has been highly influential, and many other states and even nations have imitated this structure. However, California higher education has had a poor record of college completion and four-year baccalaureate degree attainment. Subgroups such as Latinos and African Americans (whose demographics are large and growing) show even worsening statistics of degree attainment.

Effects

The Master Plan meant that essentially, "anyone from anywhere in California could, if they worked hard enough, get a bachelor’s degree from one of the best universities in the country (and, therefore, in the world), almost free of charge."

The Plan increased overall efficiency in the higher education system, as well as produced greater number of graduates at a lower per-student cost by removing redundancies. This was accomplished by clearly specifying the missions of each system segment, in addition to clarifying what "territory" belonged to each institution.

The Plan established a "rational" planning process for the growth of the university systems.  This displaced the state legislature's past tendency to introduce bills to establish new four-year universities in members' home districts, a kind of political pork.  In his memoirs, Kerr highlighted the 1957 creation of California State University, Stanislaus as a particularly egregious example of this tendency.

The Plan was inspired in part by Kerr's pragmatic realization that not all institutions of higher education can or should become research universities. As Kerr explained in his memoirs: "The state did not need a higher education system where every component was intent on being another Harvard or Berkeley or Stanford."  Faculty members at state colleges regarded them as "graveyards of disappointed expectations" and wished they were located at the research universities from which they had obtained their doctoral degrees.  Therefore, the Plan was intended to concentrate state resources at the top, rather than spreading them too thin among far too many would-be research universities.  Most other states were unable to restrain the ambitions of their various colleges and universities to become research universities and suffered from "a proliferation of doctoral and costly research programs".  For example, Texas promoted too many colleges to university status during the 20th century, with the result that by 2009, only three of the state's universities had achieved the prestigious R1 classification assigned by the Carnegie Classification of Institutions of Higher Education to the most advanced American research universities.  It was only in 2009 that Texas belatedly enacted House Bill 51 to specifically promote the development of nationally competitive research universities by creating the National Research University Fund and the Texas Research Incentive Program.  By 2019, six more Texas universities had reached the R1 classification.

By setting "rigid" boundaries for each segment of public higher education, the Plan ensured the continued availability of a wide range of educational options for the types of students to be served by each segment.  In contrast, mission creep continues to be a serious problem in several other states which failed to impose and effectively enforce such boundaries. For example, as of January 2021, the U.S. Department of Education no longer recognized the Nevada System of Higher Education as having any public community colleges under federal standards, after Nevada allowed its purported community colleges to create too many four-year programs during the 2010s and thereby allowed them to deviate too far from the traditional community college role.  The result was that as of 2021, Nevada could not provide its workforce with enough technicians who traditionally earn two-year associate degrees at community colleges, and needed to import them from adjacent states like Arizona and California which still have actual community colleges.

The Plan was the basis for a substantial surge in development in California higher education. Today, many credit the California universities for the place the state holds in the world economy, as well as bolstering its own economic makeup with great investment in high technology areas, such as Silicon Valley, biotechnology, and pharmaceuticals.

The Plan has contributed to the massive economic contributions that the UC, CSU, and CCC systems have had to the state and its growth. According to a study by the Regents of California, the UC system is directly responsible for adding about $32.8 billion to the gross state product, which is about 1.8 percent of the total GSP, a key indicator of economic performance.

Subsequent changes
In 1972, a review of the Plan found that the basic structure was good, but that it should be changed slightly to accommodate the ideas of the time. For example, the review board suggested that weekend and evening programs should be expanded to serve “non-traditional” students, and that the Plan should take advantage of then-new technologies such as educational television.

In 1978, Proposition 13, the People's Initiative to Limit Property Taxation, was enacted, causing free public education to be eliminated. (Since tuition was still banned by the Donahoe Act, per-unit enrollment fees were charged instead.)

The 1987 revision specifically recognized the contributions of the independent sector (i.e., private and nonprofit institutions) and made explicit provision to include the independent sector in the planning functions of the state's higher education system. It also established a policy to set the maximum award for Cal Grants in state law.

In 2005, the demand for high school and community college administrators brought about a widely debated exception to the existing differentiation of function between the CSU and UC systems. The awarding of doctoral degrees had originally been exclusive to the UC system, with the provision that the California State Universities could offer PhD degrees as "joint" degrees in combination with the University of California or an accredited private university. Under the provisions of SB 724, signed into law September 22, 2005, the campuses of the California State University were then able to directly offer a Doctor of Education degree (Ed.D) "focused on preparing administrative leaders". It was argued that this fulfilled the original purpose of many of the CSU campuses, which had been founded as normal schools to train teachers.

In 2010, the CSU was also given the authority to exclusively offer two more doctoral degrees: the Doctorate in Nursing (DNP) and Doctor of Physical Therapy (DPT).

When the Master Plan was first founded in 1960, post-secondary education enrollments were equally divided among 2-year and 4-year institutions. However, in 2010, due to a lack of funding, the framers of the Master Plan limited eligibility admission to UC and CSU. The cost-cutting move diverted a large number of students to 2-year institutions, which would still allow them to finish their lower division work and then transfer to a 4-year institution.

See also
 California Postsecondary Education Commission
 California State University
 University of California
 California Community Colleges
 List of colleges and universities in California
 Rarick, Ethan (2005) The Life and Times of Pat Brown — California Rising (Ch. 7) Berkeley, CA: University of California Press

Endnotes

References
 SB 724 as chaptered in 2005
 Atkinson, Richard; Geiser, Saul. "Beyond the Master Plan:The Case for Restructuring Baccalaureate Education in California." Center for Studies in Higher Education, 2010.
 Douglass, John Aubrey. The California Idea and American Higher Education. Stanford University press, 2000.
 González, Cristina. Clark Kerr's University of California: Leadership, Diversity, and Planning in Higher Education. Transaction Publishers, 2011.

External links
 "The History of the California Master Plan for Higher Education," Center for Studies in Higher Education at UC Berkeley with links to relevant documents and legislation
 University of California Master Plan website with copies of many relevant documents
 The Future of Flagship Universities, by Robert Berdahl, former Chancellor, UC Berkeley
 Clark Kerr's legacy: 1960 Master Plan transformed higher education, UC Berkeley public relations office
  The CSU Public Affairs Photo Collection on the Online Archive of California — encompasses photographic material from the late 19th century to the early 1990s and collection finding aid provides history of CSU within Master Plan.
 The History and Future of the California Master Plan for Higher Education
 Brief Guide to the Master Plan
 The Dream is Over: The Crisis of Clark Kerr’s California Idea of Higher Education by Simon Marginson

M
M
M
Education policy in the United States